The Lagonda LG6 is a large car produced by the British Lagonda company from 1937 until 1940. It was announced at the 1937 London Motor Show.

Suspension is independent torsion bar front suspension and live rear axle with Spiral bevel gear final drive. The braking system is Lockheed hydraulic.

The 4453 cc Straight-six engine with pushrod operated overhead valves was bought in from Henry Meadows of Wolverhampton and previously used in the LG45 model Drive is to the rear wheels through a single dry plate clutch and four-speed gearbox.

Standard coachwork included saloon, tourer, coupé and sedanca styles. The tourer was also available in Rapide version and had a higher compression ratio engine but only two were sold.

The car can be distinguished from the V12 by the twin long trumpet horns on either side of the radiator grille.

67 of the short chassis and 18 long chassis were made.

Only one LG6, chassis number 12341, was sold into the Netherlands, to the architect Jan Frederik van Erven Dorens for 13,200 guilders in 1938. After the Liberation of the Netherlands in 1945, it was used by Field Marshal Bernard Montgomery for victory parades in Amsterdam. The car was not returned after the war but became part of Prince Bernhard's collection. In 2003, Erven Dorens' grandson Robin produced a film Lagonda about the car.

References

LG6
1930s cars
Cars introduced in 1937